The Headies 2014 was the ninth edition of The Headies. It took place on 14 December 2014, at the Eko Hotel and Suites in Victoria Island, Lagos. Themed "Feel the Passion", the show was hosted by Toke Makinwa and Basketmouth. It was initially scheduled to hold on 25 October 2014. Bovi was initially announced as one of the hosts, but ended up not hosting due to him being booked for another show. On 30 September 2014, nominations were announced during a press briefing at the HipTV office in Allen, Lagos. Kcee, Olamide and Phyno led the nominations with five each. Tiwa Savage, Oritse Femi and The Mavins followed closely with four apiece. Yemi Alade was nominated for Song of the Year, Best Pop Single and Next Rated. Olamide, Patoranking and Davido each took home two awards apiece. Don Jazzy won the Producer of the Year plaque, while Sir Victor Uwaifo got the Hall of Fame recognition.

Performers

 Nikki Laoye
 Cynthia Morgan
 Yemi Alade
 Davido
 Dr SID
 Patoranking
 Timi Dakolo
 P-Square
 Sir Victor Uwaifo
 Skales

Winners and nominees

References

2014 music awards
2014 in Nigerian music
The Headies